Warbonnet Peak is located in the Sawtooth Wilderness of Sawtooth National Recreation Area in Boise County.

References 

Mountains of Boise County, Idaho
Mountains of Idaho
Sawtooth Wilderness